Liza Lim (born 30 August 1966) is an Australian composer. Lim writes concert music (chamber and orchestral works) as well as music theatre and has collaborated with artists on a number of installation and video projects. Her work reflects her interests in Asian ritual culture, the aesthetics of Aboriginal art and shows the influence of non-Western music performance practice.

Early life and education
Liza Lim was born in Perth, Western Australia, to Chinese parents. They were doctors who during her early years spent long periods working and studying in Brunei, and she was sent to boarding school. At the age of 11, she was encouraged by her teachers at Presbyterian Ladies' College, Melbourne to turn from piano and violin to composition. She has said that she "owes everything to them". Lim earned her Doctor of Philosophy from the University of Queensland, her Master of Music from the University of Melbourne (1996), and her Bachelor of Arts from the Victorian College of the Arts (1986). She has studied composition in Melbourne with Richard David Hames, Riccardo Formosa, and in Amsterdam with Ton de Leeuw.

Career 
Lim has been a guest lecturer at the Darmstadt Summer School, the University of California, San Diego, Cornell University, Getty Research Institute, major Australian universities and at the IRCAM Agora Festival. She was a lecturer of composition at Melbourne University in 1991. Lim was the guest curator for the twilight concert series of the 2006 Adelaide Festival of Arts.

Lim has been commissioned by some of the most eminent performers in the world including the Los Angeles Philharmonic (for whom she wrote Ecstatic Architecture for the inaugural season of the Frank Gehry-designed Walt Disney Concert Hall), Ensemble InterContemporain, Ensemble Modern, BBC Symphony Orchestra, Arditti String Quartet and the Cikada Ensemble.

Since 1986, Lim has worked extensively with members of the ELISION Ensemble; she is married to Daryl Buckley, its artistic director. In 2005, Lim was appointed the composer-in-residence with the Sydney Symphony Orchestra for two years. Among other works, the orchestra commissioned—jointly with the radio station Bayerischer Rundfunk—her work The Compass; in its premiere performance on 23 August 2006 at the Sydney Opera House it was conducted by Alexander Briger, William Barton played the didgeridoo.

Sponsored by the German Academic Exchange Service, she spent one year in 2007/2008 as artist-in-residence in Berlin where she developed her third opera, The Navigator, inspired by Tristan and Isolde to a libretto by Patricia Sykes. She was appointed professor in composition at the University of Huddersfield in March 2008.

In March 2017 her appointment to the composition unit at the Sydney Conservatorium of Music was announced.

Selected works

Stage works 
 1991–93 The Oresteia. A Memory Theatre, opera
 1994–95 Bar-do'i-thos-grol, 7-night installation performance based on The Tibetan Book of the Dead, artist Domenico de Clario
 1991–99 Yuè Lìng Jié (Moon Spirit Feasting), A Chinese ritual street opera, libretto by Beth Yahp
 2005 Glass House Mountains, installation work with artist Judy Watson
 2008 The Navigator, opera for 5 singers, 16 instruments and electronics, libretto by Patricia Sykes

Orchestra works 
 1994–95 Sri-Vidya, Utterances of Adoration for choir and orchestra
 1996 The Alchemical Wedding for orchestra (22 instruments)
 2001–02 Ecstatic Architecture, commissioned for the inaugural season at the Walt Disney Concert Hall
 2004 Immer Fliessender (Ever Flowing), a companion-piece for Gustav Mahler's Ninth Symphony
 2005 Flying Banner, "Fanfare" for orchestra, after Wang To
 2005–06 The Compass for orchestra with flute and didgeridoo soloists
 2010 Pearl, Ochre, Hair String for orchestra
 2010 The Guest for orchestra with recorder soloist

Ensemble works 
 1988–89 Garden of Earthly Desire for flute, oboe, clarinet, electric guitar, mandolin, harp, violin, viola, violoncello, contrabass, percussion
 1989 Voodoo Child for soprano solo, flute/piccolo, clarinet, violin, violoncello, trombone, piano, percussion
 1990 Diabolical Birds for piccolo, bass clarinet, piano, violin, violoncello, vibraphone
 1993 Li Shang Yin for coloratura soprano, 15 instruments
 1995 Street of Crocodiles for flute, oboe, alto saxophone, alto trombone, cimbalom/cymbal, violin, viola, violoncello, baroque violoncello
 1999 Veil for flute/bass flute, bass clarinet, trumpet in C, percussion, piano, violin, violoncello
 2001 Machine for Contacting the Dead for twenty-seven instruments
 2005 Songs Found in Dream for oboe, bass clarinet, alto sax, trumpet, 2 percussion, viola, cello
 2005 Mother Tongue for soprano and 15 instruments, poems by Patricia Sykes
 2006 Shimmer Songs for string quartet, harp, 3 percussion
 2006 City of Falling Angels for 12 percussion
 2007 Sensorium for soprano, C-tenor recorders, baroque harp, viola d'amore
 2010–11 Tongue of the Invisible, a work for improvising pianist, baritone and 16 musicians
 2014 Winding Bodies: 3 Knots for alto flute, bass clarinet, piano, percussion, violin, viola, violoncello and double bass

Chamber music 
 1996 Inguz (Fertility) for clarinet in A, violoncello
 1997 The Heart's Ear for flute/piccolo, clarinet, violin I, violin II, viola, violoncello
 1999 Sonorous Bodies for koto and voice solo, in collaboration with video artist Judith Wright
 2004 In the Shadow's Light for string quartet, commissioned by Festival d'automne à Paris for the Kairos Quartett
 2004–05 The Quickening for soprano and qin, commissioned by the Festival d'Automne à Paris
 2008 Ochred String for oboe, viola, cello, double bass
 2013–14 The Weaver's Knot for string quartet

Solo works 
 1992 Amulet for viola solo
 1997 Philtre for Hardanger fiddle solo or retuned violin
 2007 Wild Winged–one for solo trumpet
 2007 Weaver–of–Fictions for alto Ganassi recorder
 2007 The Long Forgetting for tenor Ganassi recorder
 2008 Well of Dreams for solo alto trombone
 2008 Sonorous Body for solo B clarinet
 2011 Love Letter for solo instrument

Awards and nominations

APRA Classical Music Awards
The APRA Classical Music Awards are presented annually by Australasian Performing Right Association (APRA) and Australian Music Centre (AMC).

|-
|rowspan="2"| 2007 || Flying Banner (After Wang To) (Liza Lim) – Sydney Symphony, Gianluigi Gelmetti (conductor) || Orchestral Work of the Year || 
|-
|Liza Lim – Sydney Symphony Composer Residency || Outstanding Contribution by an Individual ||

Don Banks Music Award
The Don Banks Music Award was established in 1984 to publicly honour a senior artist of high distinction who has made an outstanding and sustained contribution to music in Australia. It was founded by the Australia Council in honour of Don Banks, Australian composer, performer and the first chair of its music board.

|-
| 2018
| Liza Lim
| Don Banks Music Award
| 
|-

1996 Australia Council fellowship
1996 (inaugural) Young Australian Creative Fellowship
2002 APRA Classical Music Award (Best Composition)
2004 Paul Lowin Award for Ecstatic Architecture

References
Composer's page on ELISION Ensemble website

External links

Australian Music Centre: biography, catalogue of works, recordings, digital samples, articles
Recordings at Amazon
Liza Lim's new opera at the Opéra national de Paris
Publisher's website: Liza Lim at Ricordi

1966 births
20th-century classical composers
21st-century classical composers
APRA Award winners
Australian expatriates in Brunei
Australian expatriates in England
Australian expatriates in Germany
Australian expatriates in the United States
Australian women classical composers
Australian opera composers
Women opera composers
Living people
Victorian College of the Arts alumni
20th-century women composers
21st-century women composers